Carbohydrate antigen 19-9 (CA19-9), also known as sialyl-LewisA, is a tetrasaccharide which is usually attached to O-glycans on the surface of cells. It is known to play a role in cell-to-cell recognition processes. It is also a tumor marker used primarily in the management of pancreatic cancer.

Structure
CA19-9 is the sialylated form of Lewis AntigenA. It is a tetrasaccharide with the sequence Neu5Acα2-3Galβ1-3[Fucα1-4]GlcNAcβ.

Clinical significance

Tumor marker
Guidelines from the American Society of Clinical Oncology discourage the use of CA19-9 as a screening test for cancer, particularly pancreatic cancer. The reason is that the test may be falsely normal (false negative) in many cases, or abnormally elevated in people who have no cancer at all (false positive). The main use of CA19-9 is therefore to see whether a pancreatic tumor is secreting it; if that is the case, then the levels should fall when the tumor is treated, and they may rise again if the disease recurs. Therefore it is useful as a surrogate marker for relapse.

In people with pancreatic masses, CA19-9 can be useful in distinguishing between cancer and other diseases of the gland.

Limitations
CA19-9 can be elevated in many types of gastrointestinal cancer, such as colorectal cancer, esophageal cancer and hepatocellular carcinoma. Apart from cancer, elevated levels may occur in pancreatitis, cirrhosis, and diseases of the bile ducts. It can also be elevated in people with obstruction of the bile ducts.

In patients who lack the Lewis antigen A (a blood type antigen on red blood cells), which is about 10% of the Caucasian population, CA19-9 is not produced by any cells, even in those with large tumors. This is because of a deficiency of a fucosyltransferase enzyme that is needed to produce Lewis antigen A.

History
CA19-9 was discovered in the serum of patients with colon cancer and pancreatic cancer in 1981. It was characterized shortly after, and it was found to be carried primarily by mucins.

See also
 Sialyl-Lewis X
 Lewis antigen system

References

External links
 
 CA19-9 at Lab Tests Online
 CA19-9: analyte monograph - The Association for Clinical Biochemistry and Laboratory Medicine
 Essentials of Glycobiology 3rd Edition, Chapter 14: "Structures Common to Different Glycans" https://www.ncbi.nlm.nih.gov/books/NBK453042/#_Ch14_s2_

Amino sugars
Tetrasaccharides
Acetamides
Tumor markers
Pancreatic cancer